Promelacacinidin is a polymeric condensed tannin composed of mesquitol. This type of tannin can be found in Senegalia caffra.

The oxidative depolymerization of proteracacinidins yields the anthocyanidin melacacinidin.

References 

Condensed tannins
Senegalia